Lloyd Glasspool and Matt Reid were the defending champions but chose not to defend their title.

André Göransson and Nathaniel Lammons won the title after defeating Rafael Matos and Felipe Meligeni Alves 7–6(7–3), 6–3 in the final.

Seeds

Draw

References

 Main draw

Biella Challenger V - Doubles